This article lists vice governors of North Sumatra who have assisted the governor of North Sumatra.

References 

Lists of Indonesian politicians